Bioregenerative life support systems (BLSS) are artificial ecosystems consisting of many complex symbiotic relationships among higher plants, animals, and microorganisms. As the most advanced life support technology, BLSS can provide a habitation environment similar to Earth's biosphere for space missions with extended durations, in deep space, and with multiple crews. These systems consist of artificial ecosystems into which plants and microorganisms that allow oxygen production, carbon dioxide fixation of carbon, water purification, waste recycling, and production of foods. In these systems, photosynthetic organisms would be used as plants and algae that provide biomass for food and oxygen, as well as microorganisms that degrade and recycle waste compounds generated by human activity, as well as unused plant debris in food.

See also

References

Space research